Shamanuru Shivashankarappa (Kannada: ಶಾಮನೂರು ಶಿವಶಂಕರಪ್ಪ) (born 16 June 1930) is a politician from the state of Karnataka and a Member of the Legislative Assembly of Davanagere South Assembly Constituency.

Career
A veteran congressman, he has been the treasurer of Karnataka Pradesh Congress Committee for the past three decades and is also the president of All India Veerashaiva Mahasabha, the apex body of Veerashaivas. As a well known educationalist and industrialist, he is the chairman of Bapuji Educational Association which owns a chain of educational institutions including Bapuji Institute of Engineering & Technology and many professional institutions of higher education, and also owns a group of industries known as Shamanur Group, which have sugar and distilleries as their prime business. He was the co-producer of the 1970 Kannada movie Boregowda Bangalorige Banda.

Personal life
His son Shamanur Mallikarjun, a former Minister for youth and Sports in the Government of Karnataka, was a Member of the Legislative Assembly representing Davangere North Constituency.

References

State cabinet ministers of Karnataka
1931 births
Living people
People from Davanagere district
Karnataka MLAs 2008–2013
Karnataka MLAs 2013–2018
Karnataka MLAs 2018–2023